The Fischtown Pinguins, also known as REV Bremerhaven, are a professional ice hockey team based in Bremerhaven, Germany. From 2004 to 2016 the team played at the second level of ice hockey in Germany, until the 2012–13 season the 2nd Bundesliga and, from the 2013–14 season onward the DEL2. On 1 July 2016 the team was granted a DEL licence for the 2016–17 season to replace the Hamburg Freezers in the league which had withdrawn from the competition.

The team plays in the Eisarena Bremerhaven.

Season records

Players
Updated 15 February 2023.

|}

Tournament results

References

External links
 
Fischtown Pinguins on Eurohockey
Fischtown Pinguins on HockeyDB
Firsthand account of a visit to a Pinguins game

Deutsche Eishockey Liga teams
Ice hockey teams in Germany
Ice hockey clubs established in 1974
1974 establishments in Germany
Sport in Bremerhaven